One of the dialects of the Maltese language is the Żejtun dialect (Standard  or ;). This dialect is used by many of the inhabitants of Żejtun and in other settlements around this city such as Marsaxlokk, and spoken by about 12,000 people.

The following three words are examples; there are many more that make it into the list of vocabulary found in this dialect.

For 'kite' the Standard Maltese word is tajra, but in this dialect it is found as manuċċa.
For 'foggy weather' the Standard Maltese word is ċpar, but in this dialect it is found as ċlambu.
For 'slingshot' the Standard Maltese word is żbandola, but in this dialect it is found as steringa.

All the vocal letters in this dialect possess a liquid versatility which allows the position, emphasis and tone of the vowels to change without any distinct rule; in some words the consonant letters are found to change as well. Such variations in the dialect are innate to native speakers.

The vowel A

The vowel a in the Żejtun dialect changes into /u/ or /e/. For example:

This change happens to roughly all of the words that end in the vowel a, but when the syllable structure does not allow the vowel a to change into e, such as in the Maltese equivalent of potato, i.e. patata, a different vowel has to be used to elongate the syllable. Here, the word does not become petete but changes into û, becoming patûta.

The vowel E

The vowel e changes into the vowels /a/ or also /i/. For example:

The vowel O

The vowel o in this dialect changes into u, however it demands an element of phonetical emphasis to differentiate this changed u from the previous one. In philology such emphasis requires an accent, hence it is notated as ù. Example:

This change occurs in many other words that have o as their first vowel.

The vowel U

When the last vowel of the word is u, it changes into the diphthong /ow/. Sometimes the u is changed into ew. Example:

References 

Dialects of Maltese
Żejtun